The Church of San Francis of Assisi is a Catholic parish church in the city of León, Spain located on Corredera Street and in front of the San Francisco Garden. It is one of the main churches of the city and is associated with the convent of the Capuchins.

History 

Built outside the walled city, in its southern part, the first church of San Francisco was built in the 13th century. In 1763 during the reign of Charles III begins the construction of the current church, larger than the previous one and with classicist forms. Under the direction of Francisco de Rivas the church finished its construction in 1791 already under the reign of Charles IV.

In 1880, the Third Order of Saint Francis bought the church and convent after 44 years without religious use, beginning the restoration of the church building. In this period the main altar is placed, one of the jewels of the church. The current altarpiece of the church of San Francisco was the altarpiece of the main altar of the Cathedral of León made in 1733 and that for almost a century and a half presided over the Leon cathedral. 

At the end of the 19th century during the restoration of the cathedral by Juan de Madrazo the altarpiece was dismantled to return it to the church with more Gothic forms. The Capuchin community decided at that time to buy the baroque altarpiece and install it in the church of San Francisco. In 1882, the works of restoration of the church finished. In the 20th century, several restorations stand out in 1964 and 1996.

Architecture 

Like many churches of this period, it follows the model established in the Church of the Gesù of Rome, which was a significant model for many Catholic, especially Jesuit, Baroque churches. The façade repeats, with simpler materials, the general composition of the Gesù, including the large scrolls supporting the upper region of the nave. In plan, the church echoes the Gesù's single nave with side chapels, shallow transepts, and a dome over the crossing.

The church is attached to the convent of the Capuchin order, which highlights its cloister, and the San Francisco theater.

References

External links 

 http://www.sanfranciscoleon.com/

Buildings and structures in León, Spain
Roman Catholic churches in Castile and León
Churches completed in 1791